The 2012 Eurocup Mégane Trophy season was the eighth season of the Renault–supported touring car category, a one-make racing series that is part of the World Series by Renault.

Driver lineup

Driver changes
Changed teams
Fabien Thuner switched from Boutsen Energy Racing to Oregon Team.
David Dermont moved to Team Lompech Sport.
Bas Schothorst and Jeroen Schothorst both moved to TDS Racing.

Entering Eurocup Mégane Trophy
Eurocup Clio champion Nicolas Milan, Formula Renault Alps driver Kevin Gilardoni and Formula Renault 3.5 Series driver Albert Costa debuted with Oregon Team.
FIA Formula Two Championship driver Kelvin Snoeks entered the championship for TDS Racing.

Team changes
Boutsen Energy Racing, Equipe Verschuur, Brixia Horse Power and Blue Jumeirah Team have all left the Eurocup Mégane Trophy.

Mid-season changes
 Rembert Berg debuted in the series, joining Michael Munemann in the Algarve Pro Racing Team.
 Tom Coronel made his debut in the series, replacing Wim Beelen from the Nürburgring round onwards.
 David Dermont was replaced by Thibault Bossy at Nürburgring. Defending series champion Stefano Comini replaced Bossy for the Moscow round.
 Bruce Lorgère-Roux replaced Toni Forne after the opening round at Alcañiz.
 Roberto Moreno made his debut in the series, replacing Nicolas Milan at the Moscow event.

Race calendar and results
The calendar for the 2012 season was announced on 10 October 2011, the day after the end of the 2011 season. Silverstone Circuit was dropped from the calendar in favour of a round at the new Moscow Raceway in Russia. All seven rounds will form meetings of the 2012 World Series by Renault season.

Championship standings
 Points for both championships were awarded as follows:

Drivers' Championship

References

External links
 Renault-Sport official website

Eurocup Megane Trophy
Eurocup Megane Trophy
Eurocup Mégane Trophy seasons